Aszód is a district in north-eastern part of Pest County. Aszód is also the name of the town where the district seat is found. The district is located in the Central Hungary Statistical Region.

Geography 
Aszód District borders with Pásztó District (Nógrád County) to the north, Hatvan District (Heves County) and Jászberény District (Jász-Nagykun-Szolnok County) to the east, Gödöllő District to the southwest, Vác District to the west. The number of the inhabited places in Aszód District is 11.

Municipalities 
The district has 2 towns, 2 large villages and 7 villages.
(ordered by population, as of 1 January 2013)

The bolded municipalities are cities, italics municipalities are large villages.

Demographics

In 2011, it had a population of 37,472 and the population density was 126/km².

Ethnicity
Besides the Hungarian majority, the main minorities are the Roma (approx. 2,000), German (1,000), Romanian and Slovak (150).

Total population (2011 census): 37,472
Ethnic groups (2011 census): Identified themselves: 36,468 persons:
Hungarians: 33,075 (90.70%)
Gypsies: 1,850 (5.07%)
Germans: 959 (2.63%)
Others and indefinable: 584 (1.60%)
Approx. 1,000 persons in Aszód District did not declare their ethnic group at the 2011 census.

Religion
Religious adherence in the county according to 2011 census:

Catholic – 20,398 (Roman Catholic – 20,268; Greek Catholic – 122);
Evangelical – 4,020; 
Reformed – 1,596;
other religions – 686; 
Non-religious – 2,495; 
Atheism – 271;
Undeclared – 8,006.

Gallery

See also
List of cities and towns in Hungary

References

External links
 Postal codes of the Aszód District

Districts in Pest County